Brandon Pritzl (born January 7, 1992) is an American basketball coach who is the current assistant coach of the Green Bay Phoenix men's basketball team.

Coaching career

Ohio Graduate Assistant
Pritzl was a Graduate Assistant at Ohio under Saul Phillips to in 2014-2016. While with the Bobcats, Pritzl was responsible for many aspects of the program’s day-to-day operations, including ticket management, keeping recruiting databases up to date, and working with the Jump Program and the school’s summer camps.

Hillsdale Assistant
Pritzl returned to take the place of another former Charger, Luke Laser, on the coaching staff before the 2016-17 season.

Hillsdale Associate Head Coach
April 2020, Pritzl was named Associate Head Coach for the Hillsdale men's basketball program.

UWGB Assistant
On July 6, 2020, Pritzl was announced as the new assistant coach at Green Bay.

Personal
Brandon's father, Brian, played college basketball at St. Norbert and his brother, Brevin, played College Basketball for the Wisconsin Badgers men’s basketball and is currently playing professionally for Team FOG Næstved in Denmark  and has previously played for Tamiš of the Basketball League of Serbia.

References

External links
UWGB basketball notebook: De Pere's Brandon Pritzl excited to return home
Hillsdale - Brandon Pritzl Bio
College Stats
Former Redbird Pritzl to join UW-Green Bay coaching staff
Green Bay’s Ryan hires three for first coaching staff
Pritzl's Twitter

1992 births
Living people
American men's basketball coaches
Basketball coaches from Wisconsin
Basketball players from Wisconsin
Green Bay Phoenix men's basketball coaches
Hillsdale Chargers men's basketball coaches
Ohio Bobcats men's basketball coaches
Hillsdale Chargers men's basketball players
People from De Pere, Wisconsin